Shrinking the Blob is the first full-length album by American post-grunge band Oleander. It was released independently on Fine Records. Several tracks would be re-released on the band's major label debut, February Son, including the hit single "Why I'm Here." The song "Jimmy Shaker Day" was also included on  the 2001 follow-up, Unwind.

Overview
After releasing an eponymous EP 1996, Oleander developed a full-length album, Shrinking the Blob, the following year. This included songs from their EP release as well as some future hit singles.

Oleander gave the album to a friend who worked at 98-Rock KRXQ and had it passed on to program director Curtiss Johnson. Their efforts gained radio exposure for two songs from Shrinking the Blob, "Down When I'm Loaded" and "Stupid." The former gradually became a regional hit, and after opening for Sugar Ray, Oleander was approached by a representative of Republic Records. This paved way for a deal with Universal and the re-recording of their 1997 studio album.

Track listing
(All songs written by Thomas Flowers, Doug Eldridge, Ric Ivanisevich and Fred Nelson Jr.)
 "Where Were You Then?" – 3:56
 "Stupid" – 3:59
 "Down When I'm Loaded" – 4:32
 "Why I'm Here" – 3:57
 "You'll Find Out" – 2:42
 "Jimmy Shaker Day" – 3:21
 "Candy Store" – 4:25
 "Silver Lined" – 2:49
 "Half an Ass" – 2:59
 "Shrinking the Blob" – 4:25

Personnel
 Thomas Flowers - vocals, guitar
 Doug Eldridge - bass guitar
 Ric Ivanisevich - guitar
 Fred Nelson Jr. - drums

References

Oleander (band) albums
1997 debut albums